The Nicholas P. Goulandris Foundation - Museum of Cycladic Art is a museum of Athens. It houses a notable collection of artifacts of Cycladic art.

The museum was founded in 1986 in order to house the collection of Cycladic and Ancient Greek art belonging to Nicholas and Dolly Goulandris. Starting in the early 1960s, the couple collected Greek antiquities, with special interest in the prehistoric art from the Cyclades islands of the Aegean Sea.
The Museum's main building, erected in the centre of Athens in 1985, was designed by the Greek architect Ioannis Vikelas. In 1991, the Museum acquired a new wing, the neo-classical Stathatos Mansion at the corner of Vassilissis Sofias Avenue and Herodotou Street.

The museum has housed temporary exhibitions of some of the most important Greek and international modern and contemporary artists.

 October 2002 - February 2003: Salvador Dalí - Myth and Singularity
 April 2006 - July 2006: Caravaggio - Caravaggio and the 17th Century
 November 2006 - January 2007:  - Itineraries through light and colour
 October 2007 - January 2008: El Greco - El Greco and his Workshop/El Greco y su taller
 June 2009 - September 2009: Thomas Struth
 September 2009 - October 2009: Palle Nielsen Man, Dream and Fear - Orpheus and Eurydice Through the Eyes of Palle Nielsen
 May 2010 - September 2010: Louise Bourgeois - Personages
 April 2012 - September 2012: Jannis Kounellis
 May 2012 - October 2012: Ugo Rondinone - Nude
 October 2013 - January 2014: Martin Kippenberger - Martin Kippenberger: A cry for freedom | Organized by NEON
 October 2015 - January 2016: Mario Merz - Numbers are prehistoric | Organized by NEON in collaboration with Fondazione Merz
 March 2016 - May 2016: Wols and Eileen Quinlan - Always stars with encounter | Wols / Eileen Quinlan
 May 2016 - October 2016: Ai Weiwei - Ai Weiwei at Cycladic: The subversive artist Ai Weiwei for the first time in Greece
 May 2017 - September 2017: Cy Twombly and Greek antiquity | Part of the Divine Dialogues exhibition series
 November 2017 - February 2018: Mike Kelley - Mike Kelley: Fortress of Solitude | Organized by NEON
 June 2018 - October 2018: George Condo - George Condo at Cycladic: The first major solo museum exhibition of the American artist George Condo in Greece
 July 2018 - October 2018: Paul Chan - Paul Chan | Odysseus and the Bathers | Organized by NEON
 June 2019 - October 2019 : Picasso and Antiquity -  Line and clay | Part of the Divine Dialogues exhibition series
 November 2019 - March 2020: Lynda Benglis - Lynda Benglis: In the Realm of the Senses | Organized by NEON

See also 
 Cycladic art
 Cycladic civilization
 List of museums in Greece

References

External links 

 
 Ministry of Culture and Tourism
 www.athensinfoguide.com
 Goulandris Museum of Cycladic Art within Google Arts & Culture

Cycladic Art
Museums established in 1986
Goulandris family
Cycladic civilization
Art museums and galleries in Greece
1986 establishments in Greece
Cycladic art